Poyntonophrynus vertebralis is a species of toad in the family Bufonidae. It is found in South Africa, Lesotho, and possibly Botswana and southeastern Zimbabwe. It has many common names: pigmy toad, pygmy toad, flat toad, African dwarf toad, and southern pygmy toad.

Its natural habitats are Nama karroo shrubland, grassland, dry savanna, and pastureland. It is a locally common species that breeds in various small waterbodies (temporary shallow pans, pools or depressions containing rainwater, quarries, and rock pools along rivers). It is locally threatened by habitat loss.

References

vertebralis
Frogs of Africa
Vertebrates of Lesotho
Amphibians of South Africa
Taxa named by Andrew Smith (zoologist)
Amphibians described in 1842
Taxonomy articles created by Polbot